is a Japanese long-distance runner. He represented his country in the 3000 metres steeplechase at the 2017 World Championships without qualifying for the final.

International competitions

Personal bests
Outdoor
10,000 metres – 28:16.49 (Machida 2016)
3000 metres steeplechase – 8:29.05 (Abashiri 2017)

References

1993 births
Living people
People from Kinokawa, Wakayama
Sportspeople from Wakayama Prefecture
Japanese male long-distance runners
Japanese male steeplechase runners
Competitors at the 2015 Summer Universiade
World Athletics Championships athletes for Japan
Japan Championships in Athletics winners
21st-century Japanese people